Bhagmender Lather (born 18 June 1997) is an Indian cricketer. He made his Twenty20 debut on 17 January 2021, for Chandigarh in the 2020–21 Syed Mushtaq Ali Trophy. He made his List A debut on 1 March 2021, for Chandigarh in the 2020–21 Vijay Hazare Trophy.

References

External links
 

1997 births
Living people
Indian cricketers
Chandigarh cricketers
Place of birth missing (living people)